James Alan John Harper (born 9 November 1980) is an English footballer who plays for Ascot United.

Club career

Early career
Born in Chelmsford, Essex, Harper attended the Anglo European School in Ingatestone, Essex. He started his career as a trainee with Arsenal, but as his first team opportunities were limited, he first went on loan to Cardiff City, before signing permanently for Reading for an undisclosed fee said to be "a substantial six-figure fee" at the end of February 2001.

Reading
James had a real impact at Reading including playing a key role in a number of promotions and single handled defeat of Liverpool in Reading's only ever win over one of the premier leagues big four. After helping Reading to win the 2005–06 Football League Championship, and thus win promotion to the Premier League, he scored his first Premiership goals for Reading in a clash with Newcastle United at St James' Park, scoring twice despite losing 3–2.

At the start of July 2007, Harper signed an improved three–year contract to keep him at Reading until the end of the 2009–10 season.

Sheffield United
Harper joined Sheffield United in September 2009, on loan until the end of the season. With his contract set to expire at the same time, Reading manager Brendan Rodgers admitted it was likely that he had played his last game for Reading. Harper duly made his début for The Blades in an away victory at Derby County just under a fortnight later. After being a regular in the first team from that point his loan deal was made permanent during the January transfer window, with Harper signing until the end of the season. Harper was a regular starter for the remainder of the season notching up four goals in the process. At the end of the season however his contract was not extended further and he was released.

Hull City
Harper began a trial with Hull City in early July 2010 following the arrival of Nigel Pearson as manager of the club. On 12 July 2010 it was announced that Harper had signed for Hull on a two-year contract. He made his league debut on 23 October in the home match against Portsmouth when he came on, just after half time, to replace Nolberto Solano.
Harper scored his first goal for Hull City, with a long range strike against former club Reading in a 1–1 draw at the KC Stadium on 28 December 2010.

On 24 January he moved to Wycombe Wanderers on a month-long loan.

In May 2012 it was announced that his contract at Hull would not be extended and he was released by the club.

On 26 July Harper joined Hungerford Town of the Southern Football League Division One South and West where close friend Bobby Wilkinson was Manager. Harper featured in friendlies against Mortimer and Wokingham & Emmbrook to help build match fitness as he planned a return to league football.

Doncaster Rovers
On 17 August 2012 Harper signed a one-year deal with Doncaster Rovers and made his debut as a second-half substitute in a 3 – 0 win over Walsall the next day. He won a League 1 winners medal as Doncaster won promotion to the Championship. The following season Harper made no appearances for the club leading to him leaving by mutual consent in January 2014 in search of regular football.

Non-league
On 21 March 2014, Harper signed for Conference Premier side Barnet for the remainder of the season and made his debut in the 2–0 win over Hereford United at the Hive. After six appearances, it was announced that Harper was being released at the end of the season, although he was invited back for 2014-15 pre-season training at the Hive.

On 24 October 2014 Harper signed for Basingstoke Town,
making his debut for the club on 8 November in the FA Cup first round replay at Telford United. Following some solid displays, he soon became a regular 1st team choice, making 31 appearances as Town reached the Conference South play-offs, narrowly missing out to Whitehawk at the Semi Final stage. The 2015/16 season was not so successful with the team performing poorly and sat with Basingstoke Town in 22nd position Harper was released by manager Terry Brown following a one on one meeting.

In March 2016, Harper signed for Hayes & Yeading United.

On 11 October 2016, Harper signed for Hungerford Town. After making just one league appearance for The Crusaders, he joined Metropolitan Police to make his debut in a Surrey Senior Cup loss to Kingstonian on 13 December 2016. On 3 February 2017, Hendon announced his signature.

On 16 March 2018, Harper joined Gosport Borough, making his début as a second-half substitute in a 2–5 defeat to Redditch United the following day.

Harper joined Walton Casuals for the 2018–19 season and scored on his debut against Shoreham in the FA Cup, as well as his league debut against Metropolitan Police. He re-joined Gosport for the rest of the season in October.

Harper briefly re-joined Hendon at the start of the 2019–20 season before joining Uxbridge.

On 16 September 2021, Windsor announced the signing of Harper. Eight days later, Harper signed for Ascot United. He made his début for the club in the 5–0 win over Burnham on 28 September.

International career
Harper rejected the chance to go to the 2006 FIFA World Cup with Ghana, saying: "I've never even been to Ghana. I don't know the colour of their flag and it's not my country. I wouldn't feel right putting on the shirt."  He would have qualified to play for Ghana because his mother was born there.

Career statistics

Club

Honours
Reading
Championship Champions: 2005–06

Doncaster Rovers
League One Champions: 2012–13

References

External links

James Harper profile at the Doncaster Rovers website

1980 births
Living people
Sportspeople from Chelmsford
English sportspeople of Ghanaian descent
English footballers
Association football midfielders
Arsenal F.C. players
Cardiff City F.C. players
Reading F.C. players
Sheffield United F.C. players
Hull City A.F.C. players
Wycombe Wanderers F.C. players
Doncaster Rovers F.C. players
Barnet F.C. players
Basingstoke Town F.C. players
Hayes & Yeading United F.C. players
Hungerford Town F.C. players
Metropolitan Police F.C. players
Hendon F.C. players
Gosport Borough F.C. players
Walton Casuals F.C. players
Uxbridge F.C. players
Windsor F.C. players
Ascot United F.C. players
Premier League players
English Football League players
National League (English football) players
Isthmian League players
Southern Football League players